FC Zvezda Irkutsk was a Russian football club based in Irkutsk. Zvezda finished first in the Russian Second Division East in 2006, winning promotion to the Russian First Division. The club previously played in the First Division between 1992 and 1996, or five seasons, with a best result of fourth in the 1995 season.

On October 23, 2008 the club had to stop participation in the Russian First Division due to lack of funds, their main sponsor Interavia airlines was having financial problems at the time.

Notable past players
 Denis Glushakov
 Vladimir Granat
 Yan Ivanin
 Alan Kusov
 Andrey Yeshchenko
 Albin Pelak
 Ivan Babić
 Uroš Milošavljević
 Rahmatullo Fuzailov
 Oleksandr Sytnyk
 Vladimir Shishelov

References

External links
Official website 

 
Defunct football clubs in Russia
Association football clubs established in 1957
Association football clubs disestablished in 2008
Sport in Irkutsk
1957 establishments in Russia
2008 disestablishments in Russia